"Mr. Personality" is a song recorded by Gillette and produced by 20 Fingers. It was released in June 1995 as the second single from Gillette's debut solo album On the Attack.

Background
The song has been released as Gillette's second single from her debut solo album On the Attack worldwide, while in Poland and Germany, it has been released as 20 Fingers' third single credited as "20 Fingers featuring Gillette" from their debut album On the Attack and More. The track reached the top 20 in Belgium. However, sales were lower than 20 Fingers' previous hits "Short Dick Man" and "Lick It". The song also charted in Germany, New Zealand and Switzerland.

Ugly Mix
The B-Side of "Mr. Personality" is the "Ugly Mix" of the song. Technically about the same content, it is completely a different song with different beat arrangement, recorded vocals, and different lyric text and refrain. The structure of the Ugly Mix follows the style of 20 Fingers and Gillette's hit song "Short Dick Man", which has a dance beat instead of a hip hop beat and a rock beat, with minimalistic vocals, the rap verses completely removed and replaced by spoken repeatings such as in the refrain, where it was "Do, Don't, Don't, Don't want no ugly mothersucker" or "I, I, I, I don't think so, I don't think so" ("Eeny, weeny, teeny, weeny" or "Don't, Don't, Don't, Do Do, Don't, Don't, Don't" as it was in "Short Dick Man").

Track listings

Charts

References

1995 songs
1995 singles
20 Fingers songs